Emmanuel Kimmel (April 14, 1896 – July 18, 1982) was a notable underworld figure between the 1930s and 1960s and the founder of the Kinney Parking Company, a chain of parking lots and garages which evolved into the media conglomerate Warner Communications and ultimately the present day Warner Bros. Discovery.

According to  Connie Bruck, he cooperated with the major racketeer and bootlegger in Newark, Abner Zwillman. According to William Poundstone, Kimmel leased his garages to Zwillman, for storage of liquor during the Prohibition Era. FBI kept tabs on him for his business dealings with known mafia figures, and compelled him to testify in the trials of two of them; Abner Zwillman and Joe Adonis.

An illegal bookie in his early years, running the numbers game and other illicit gambling bookmaking activities in New Jersey, he was perhaps the biggest horseracing bookmaker in New York at one time, and owner of several racing horses himself.  He is also known for his early forays into card counting in blackjack in the early sixties as "Mr. X" in the classic book on card counting, Beat the Dealer by Edward O. Thorp.

References

American gamblers
American Jews
Bookmakers
Businesspeople from Newark, New Jersey
1896 births
1982 deaths
20th-century American businesspeople